El Temblor is an archaeological site in Petén Department, Guatemala which was once the location of a settlement of the Maya civilization. It is designated TMB in the Corpus of Maya Hieroglyphic Inscriptions.

Description 
The ruins at El Temblor consist of at least three groups of collapsed structures or platforms on a north-south axis. A long structure similar to a palace, at least  in length, is situated to its north-east. A damaged stela stands east of the pyramid.

Group B is located in a lower and flatter area to the south and includes at least five mounds or platforms. Group C is located further south along the site's main axis and comprises eight structures on a hill, possibly representing temples and palaces. A chultun, a bottle-shaped underground storage chamber, is situated to the west of Group C.

The site is unguarded and has been badly damaged by looters who have dug trenches and mutilated stelae. Around 1970, two sawn-off inscribed sides from an El Temblor stela were offered for sale by a New York City art gallery which claimed it to be of unknown provenance, presumed to be from Belize. One side was purchased by the Nasher Museum of Art at Duke University in Durham, North Carolina. The other side was purchased privately and its whereabouts are unknown.

El Temblor has not yet been investigated archaeologically. However, its visible architectural features suggest that it dates from the Late Classic period (circa AD 600–909).

References

Archaeological sites in Guatemala
Former populated places in Guatemala
Maya Classic Period
Maya sites in Petén Department